Clinton Township is a township in Sac County, Iowa, USA.

Geography 
The township's elevation is listed as 1283 feet above mean sea level. It has a total area of 36.36 square miles.

History 
Clinton Township was founded in 1874. It was named for Clinton County, Iowa, from which many of its early residents came.

Demographics 
As of the 2010 census, Clinton township had a population of 175 and 73 housing units.

Education 
Clinton Township is part of the Odebolt–Arthur Community School District.

References

Townships in Sac County, Iowa
Townships in Iowa